The PineTab is a low-cost tablet developed by Hong Kong-based computer manufacturer Pine64. The PineTab was announced in May 2020, with shipping beginning in September 2020. It is based on the platform of the existing Pine A64 single board computer, with the platform being used in related devices, such as the Pinebook and PinePhone.

History and editions
In May 2020, Pine64 announced the PineTab tablet at a starting price of $99, alongside an optional detachable backlit keyboard. Pre-orders began shortly after the announcement. Devices were first shipped to developers and early adopters, though shipping was delayed until September 2020 for consumers. It then later experienced shipping delays and shortages for components due to the COVID-19 pandemic, which made Pine64 decide to allocate more resources for the then-released PinePhone, creating varying availability.

In December 2022, Pine64 announced a successor to the original device, dubbed the "PineTab 2".

Hardware
The PineTab uses an Allwinner A64 SoC, which has four Cortex-A53 cores clocked at 1.152 GHz, alongside a Mali-400 MP2 GPU, together with 2GB LPDDR3 of RAM and a 6000mAh battery. It has 64GB of eMMC flash memory, alongside a M.2 slot for optional expansion with a solid-state drive or cellular modem. Storage capacity can also be expanded with a microSD, which is bootable.

It supports Wi-Fi 802.11b/g/n and Bluetooth 4.0, has one USB 2.0 port, a micro USB 2.0 port with OTG, Mini-HDMI for external display output and a 3.5mm headphone jack. The device also contains stereo speakers, a 5MP rear camera and a 2MP front facing camera. The display is a 10" IPS LCD with a resolution of 1280×800. It weighs 575 grams (1.3 pounds).

Software
The PineTab aims to be an open platform for the development of free and open source software for Linux on mobile devices. Operating systems include Ubuntu Touch, postmarketOS, Mobian (Debian ARM) and Arch Linux ARM.

See also 

 Pine64
 Pinebook
 PinePhone
 Linux for mobile devices

References

External links 
 PineTab official page
 PineTab - PINE64 Wiki

Tablet computers introduced in 2020
Linux-based devices